Devil ray may refer to: 
 Rays of the genus Mobula, cartilaginous fish including:
 Pygmy devil ray, Mobula eregoodootenkee
 Lesser devil ray, Mobula hypostoma
 Spinetail mobula, Mobula japanica
 Shortfin devil ray, Mobula kuhlii
 Devil fish, Mobula mobular
 Munk's devil ray, Mobula munkiana
 Lesser Guinean devil ray, Mobula rochebrunei
 Chilean devil ray, Mobula tarapacana
 Bentfin devil ray, Mobula thurstoni
 Manta ray, Manta birostris, the largest of the rays
 Tampa Bay Rays, an American League baseball team based St. Petersburg, Florida, known as the Tampa Bay Devil Rays from 1998–2007
Several of the franchise's affiliated minor league baseball teams use "Devil Rays" or "Rays" as a nickname:
 Southwest Michigan Devil Rays of Battle Creek, Michigan, in the single 'A' Class Midwest League
 Princeton Rays of Princeton, West Virginia, in the 'R' Class Appalachian League
 Devil Ray, a Justice League Unlimited villain based on the DC Comics villain Black Manta